Guido van der Valk (born 26 January 1980) is a Dutch professional golfer.

Career
After a successful amateur career, which included representing his country at the Eisenhower Trophy, van der Valk turned down several college offers to turn professional in 2002. He joined the Challenge Tour and finished 36th in the standings in his debut season, the highlight being a second-place finish behind Iain Pyman at the BMW Russian Open. After two disappointing seasons he joined the Asian Tour in 2005. In 2007 he just missed out on retaining his card by finishing one place out at 61st in the Order of Merit; Thammanoon Sriroj in 60th earned just $455 more. However, van der Valk rectified this the following year by enjoying his most successful Asian season to date in 2008, finishing 52nd on the Order of Merit.

In 2011, van der Valk posted his best result to date on the Asian Tour, losing out in a five-man playoff to Himmat Rai at the ISPS Handa Singapore Classic. Two weeks later he won on the Asian Development Tour at the PGM-MIDF KLGCC Classic. Going into the final event of the main tour season, the Thailand Golf Championship, he was 83rd on the Order of Merit, but he finished T6th to climb to 59th and retain his card. It was the first time he had retained his card automatically since 2008.

Professional wins (9)

Asian Development Tour wins (1)

1Co-sanctioned by the Professional Golf of Malaysia Tour

Philippine Golf Tour wins (6)

Other wins (2)
2004 ABN Amro, Dutch PGA Championship

Playoff record
Asian Tour playoff record (0–1)

Team appearances
Amateur
Eisenhower Trophy (representing the Netherlands): 2000

References

External links

Dutch male golfers
European Tour golfers
Asian Tour golfers
People from Lelystad
Sportspeople from Manila
Sportspeople from Flevoland
1980 births
Living people
21st-century Dutch people